William Mainwaring (1884–1971) was a Welsh miner, trade unionist and politician.

William Mainwaring may also refer to:

William Mainwaring (English politician) (1735–1821), MP for Middlesex 1784–1802
Billy Mainwaring (William Thomas Mainwaring), Welsh rugby union player
William Massey-Mainwaring, Irish art collector and politician
William Mainwaring, governor of Hudson's Bay Company (1807–1812)